Senanayake Samudraya (Sinhala: සේනානායක සමූද්‍රය, Tamil: சேனானாயக்க சமூத்ரய) is the biggest reservoir and man-made lake in Sri Lanka. It is locally known as the sea (Sinhala:සමූද්‍රය samudraya, Tamil :கடல்). Senanayake Samudraya was opened on 28 August 1949 under the Gal Oya Multipurpose Scheme, which was completed in 1953 by D. S. Senanayake.

Senanayake Samudraya was formed by damming the Gal Oya river and other smaller rivers in between a pair of mountains in Inginiyagala.

Senanayake Samudraya is the largest and one of the most iconic reservoirs with an earthen dam built after receiving freedom from the British and was completed in 1953. The reservoir is sometimes referred to as “Inginiyagala Reservoir”. The Senanayaka Samudraya is part of the Gal Oya multipurpose irrigation system project which started in the year 1949 and completed in 1953 by the first prime minister of Sri Lanka, D. S. Senanayake.

Tourism 

The Senanayake Samudraya is the largest body of water ever created in Sri Lanka. Cradled between Siyabalanduwa and Ampara, the reservoir is bordered by the rising mountains of Inginiyagala. There is a national park near Senanayake Samudraya, known as the Gal Oya National Park, which is home to lots of wildlife, including more than 200 elephants, as well as bears and leopards. A development of the Gal Oya Project, the reservoir that irrigates the dry lands of the east of Sri Lanka, the lake attracts thousands of visitors annually. It is one of the major tourist attractions in Sri Lanka.

Reference 

1953 establishments in Ceylon
Bodies of water of Ampara District
Dams in Sri Lanka
Reservoirs in Sri Lanka